Tecophilaea is a genus of cormous plants in the family Tecophilaeaceae. There are two known species, both native to southern South America.

Tecophilaea was named for Tecophila Billotti, botanical artist and daughter of the Italian botanist Luigi Aloysius Colla of Turin, who found this plant in 1836, credited with publishing the genus name after it had been suggested by Carlo Luigi Giuseppe Bertero.

Species
 Tecophilaea cyanocrocus  - Santiago Province in Chile
 Tecophilaea violiflora  - Lima Province in Peru, Coquimbo + Santiago Provinces in Chile

References

Asparagales genera
Flora of South America